The Baizai are a sub-tribe of the Bangash tribe. Believed to be the first amongst the Bangash tribesmen, along with the Miranzai, to have come down from their traditional home in the Kurram Valley to oust the Orakzais from Kohat, with assistance from Khattak tribesmen in the surrounding areas, and settle in their stead.

Origin
The name Baizai originated from that of a tribal chieftain of the Bangashes, Behzad Khan-son of Amirzai chief Daulat Khan-a tribal chieftain and feudal lord, whose wife is believed to have been a daughter of Ahmad Shah Abdali, the Amir of the Pashtuns.

The Baizai today
Today the Baizai Bangashes inhabit most of  Kurram Valley, Paktia, Paktika, Khost and rural Kohat, Hangu parts of the city limits where most government installations, institutions and commercial centers have been built on their lands. All Baizais are Sunni Muslims. All Baizai speak a harder variant Pashto language; they are called Behzadis.

References

Karlani Pashtun tribes
Pashto-language surnames
Pakistani names